Big Bone Methodist Church is a historic church in Union, Kentucky.

The Big Bone church congregation was organized in 1887.  The name derives from prehistoric animal remains discovered in the 18th century in what is now Big Bone Lick State Park.  Its first minister was Reverend George Froh, a German veteran of the Civil  War.

The current structure was built in 1888 and added to the National Register of Historic Places in 1989.  It is a gable-front nave-plan frame church.  It has regularly spaced pointed-arch windows, and is four bays along its sites and three bays on its front and back.

References

See also
National Register of Historic Places listings in Kentucky

Churches on the National Register of Historic Places in Kentucky
Queen Anne architecture in Kentucky
Churches completed in 1888
19th-century Methodist church buildings in the United States
National Register of Historic Places in Boone County, Kentucky
Methodist churches in Kentucky
Union
Union, Kentucky
1888 establishments in Kentucky